The administrative divisions of Brunei mainly consist of daerah (districts), mukim (subdistricts) and kampung or kampong (villages). They are organised hierarchically, with daerah being the first level and kampong the third level.

There are also a few municipal divisions: Bandar Seri Begawan and a few district towns. They are considered to be outside the hierarchy of the main administrative division.

All the administrative divisions are under direct governance of the government through the Ministry of Home Affairs. Generally, the administrative divisions serve for population census. The administrative areas have  limited to no autonomy, and is more pronounced towards the lowest administrative level. The major socio-political aspects such as education and law are centralised and managed through separate government ministries or departments.

Districts 

There are four districts in Brunei: Brunei-Muara, Belait, Tutong and Temburong. Brunei-Muara is the smallest district but has the most population. Belait is the largest district and the centre for the production of oil and gas.

A district is headed by a Pegawai Daerah or District Officer and assisted by an Assistant District Officer.

Mukims 

The administrative level of mukim lies below the district. At present, there are 38 mukims, with 17 in Brunei-Muara, 8 in Tutong, 8 in Belait and 5 in Temburong District. A mukim is headed by a penghulu.

Villages 

A village ( or ) is the lowest administrative level in Brunei and headed by a ketua kampong or village head. Its population varies from a few hundreds to units of thousands.

Kampong Ayer is not considered a kampong administrative division. It is simply a common term in referring to the whole of the cluster of settlements on the Brunei River. However, Kampong Ayer is a large area which consists of a few mukim and a number of kampong.

Municipalities 

There are four areas of population which are considered to be bandaran or municipality, namely:
 Bandar Seri Begawan, the country's capital; also the capital of Brunei-Muara District;
 Kuala Belait, the administrative town for Belait District;
 Seria, a town in Belait District; and
 Tutong, the administrative town for Tutong District.
The municipalities are considered outside the hierarchy of the main administrative division, as their spatial jurisdiction do not necessarily fit to any of the levels, as well as their sizes are not consistent — Bandar Seri Begawan comprises several mukims but other towns comprise only a few villages. Also, the municipalities are governed under different departments from that which administer the districts and their subdivisions, although still within the same ministry.

The municipalities are headed by Pengerusi Lembaga Bandaran or Town Board Chairman.

While Bangar is the focal town of Temburong, it is yet to have a municipal status. Similarly, Muara is a port town in Brunei-Muara District but it is also administered as a village under the mukim of Serasa.

References